Stephenson 2, also known as RSGC2 (Red Supergiant Cluster 2), is a young massive open cluster belonging to the Milky Way galaxy. It was discovered in 1990 as a cluster of red supergiants in a photographic, deep infrared survey by the astronomer Charles Bruce Stephenson, after whom the cluster is named. It is located in the constellation Scutum at the distance of about 6 kpc from the Sun. It is likely situated at the intersection of the northern end of the Long Bar of the Milky Way and the inner portion of the Scutum–Centaurus Arm—one of the two major spiral arms.

Description

26 red supergiants have been confirmed as members of the cluster, far more than any other known cluster, both in and out of the Milky Way. This includes Stephenson 2 DFK 1, which is one of the largest stars currently known. A more recent study has identified around 80 red supergiants in the line of sight of Stephenson 2, approximately 40 of them with radial velocities consistent with being cluster members.  However these stars are spread over a wider area than a typical cluster, indicating an extended stellar association similar to that found around the nearby cluster RSGC3.

The age of Stephenson 2 is estimated at 14–20 million years. The observed red supergiants with the mass of about 12–16 solar masses are type II supernova progenitors. The cluster is heavily obscured and has not been detected in the visible light. It lies close to other groupings of red supergiants known as RSGC1, RSGC3, Alicante 7, Alicante 8, and Alicante 10. The mass of the open cluster is estimated at 30–50 thousand solar masses, which makes it the second most massive open cluster in the Galaxy.

Stephenson 2 SW
Some of the stars in the vicinity of the cluster lie in a loose grouping near the cluster, including Stephenson 2 DFK 1, Stephenson 2 DFK 49 and Stephenson 2-26. This grouping was first mentioned in Deguchi (2010) and was named Stephenson 2 SW because it lies south-west of the main cluster. While the radial velocities of its members are somewhat different from the main cluster's radial velocity,(by about 7.7 km/s) The difference between the 2 velocities is still relatively small, and not enough to rule out its association with the main cluster. Thus, it was assumed that it is possibly related to Stephenson 2 itself.

Members
Stars whose rows are colored in yellow are stars supposed to be part of Stephenson 2-SW.

See also
 Stephenson 1
 Wild Duck Cluster
 Trumpler 27

References

Open clusters
Scutum (constellation)